Ayhan Gezen (born 23 June 1972) is a Turkish-German former footballer. He was part of the Hertha BSC reserve team who reached the 1993 DFB-Pokal final and made 14 appearances for Hertha's first team in the 2. Bundesliga.

References

External links

1972 births
Living people
Turkish emigrants to West Germany
Turkish footballers
German footballers
Association football forwards
Hertha BSC II players
Hertha BSC players
Berliner FC Dynamo players
FC Rot-Weiß Erfurt players
2. Bundesliga players

Association football midfielders
Footballers from Berlin
West German footballers